Doug Kingsmore Stadium (known prior to 2003 officially as Beautiful Tiger Field) is a baseball park in the southeastern United States, located in Clemson, South Carolina. It is primarily used for NCAA and is the home field of the Clemson Tigers  of the Division I Atlantic Coast Conference.

Opened  in 1970, it has a record single-game attendance of 6,636 (set on March 6, 2022, against South Carolina). Doug Kingsmore has ranked in the top 20 in attendance for 15 consecutive seasons.

History

Renaming
Former Clemson baseball player and Board of Trustees Emeritus Doug Kingsmore gave the Clemson athletic department a $1 million gift towards renovation of Clemson's baseball stadium, formerly known as Tiger Field. George Bennett, former executive director of IPTAY, made the announcement in 2000. Bennett also announced that the facility would be called Doug Kingsmore Stadium.

Postseason
The stadium has hosted three Atlantic Coast Conference baseball tournaments (1976, 1977, 1978), 13 NCAA regionals (1994, 1995, 1996, 1998, 2000, 2001, 2002, 2005, 2006, 2009, 2011, 2016, 2017, 2018), and four NCAA super regionals (2000, 2002, 2006, 2010).

Renovations

Renovations to Doug Kingsmore Stadium began in the summer of 2002. The design was done by HOK Sport (now Populous) and construction by Yeargin Potter Shackelford Construction. The stadium has a brick facade that surrounds every entrance. A green roof that covers much more of the stands and a press box that is twice as large adds to the comfort of fans attending the game and the media covering it. The press box, which is accessible by elevator, includes four large booths for broadcasting and a separate media center that accommodates 13 writers.

There is also a patio area outside the press box that is above the existing stands along the first and third-base lines. It is used for receptions and other events throughout the year.

Two ticket booths, concession stands with an adjoining picnic area, and enlarged restrooms make the facility easily accessible and fan-friendly. Reserved seats were also added to the grandstand. A grand stairway leading from the McFadden parking lot to the main entrance is an added feature from a convenience and aesthetic aspect.

The players also realize improvements, as four batting cages have been constructed beyond the right-field fence. The dugouts have been almost doubled in length and width. And the players have a newly renovated locker room and lounge.

Prior to 2005, PawVision, the giant replay screen that was used in the football stadium (1997–2004), was moved to Doug Kingsmore Stadium.

The facility is also equipped with a Super Sopper, which cuts down on rainouts. Clemson is one of a few schools with this machine that removes water from the field.

New Stadium Features:
Ornamental metal fence
Plaza area
Brick façade
Overhanging roof
Enlarged & temperature-controlled press box
Patio areas above the stands
Ticket booths
Enlarged concession stands
Enlarged restrooms
Chair-back seats
Left-field grandstand
Grand stairway entrance with Hall of Fame area
Indoor batting cages
Enlarged dugouts
V.I.P. parking lot and drop-off
"PawVision" giant replay screen

Attendance

In 2020, the Tigers ranked ninth among Division I baseball programs in attendance, averaging 4,311 per home game. Additionally, the Tigers ranked first in the ACC in average attendance. 

The attendance record for Doug Kingsmore Stadium was set on March 6, 2022, when 6,636 watched the Tigers defeat

See also
 List of NCAA Division I baseball venues

References

External links
 Official Stadium Website

College baseball venues in the United States
Clemson Tigers baseball
Clemson Tigers sports venues
Baseball venues in South Carolina
Sports venues completed in 1970
1970 establishments in South Carolina